Lac de Grangent is a lake in Loire, France. At an elevation of 420 m, its surface area is 3.65 km2.

Landforms of Loire (department)
Grangent
Tourist attractions in Loire (department)